Nationalist Front may refer to: 
Nationalist Front (Germany) − neo-Nazi group in Germany
Nationalist Front (United States) − neo-Nazi group in the United States
Nationalist Front of Mexico − far-right nationalist group in Mexico